Stephen Edward Foots (born September 1968) is a British businessman. He is the chief executive (CEO) of Croda International, a FTSE 100 British specialist chemicals company.

Early life
Foots was born in September 1968, and raised in the north-east of England. His father’s one-time best friend was football manager Brian Clough. He has a BSc in chemistry from the University of York.

Career
Foots has been chief executive (CEO) of Croda International since 1 January 2012. He has worked for Croda for 21 years, starting as a graduate trainee, and joined the board in July 2010.

In 2014, his total annual remuneration passed £1.4 million.

Personal life
Foots is married with children. He is a keen Sunderland A.F.C. supporter.

References

1968 births
Living people
Alumni of the University of York
British chemists
British chief executives
British corporate directors
Croda International people